The 1990–91 season was Paris Saint-Germain's 21st season in existence. PSG played their home league games at the Parc des Princes in Paris, registering an average attendance of 14,817 spectators per match. The club was presided by Francis Borelli and the team was coached by Henri Michel. Joël Bats was the team captain.

Summary

Poor results, once again showcased by their 9th-place finish in 1990–91, and competition with Racing Paris in the 1980s for recognition as the capital's top team had taken a toll on PSG. The club's budget skyrocketed and, as a result, debt kept rising. In April 1991, after yet another defeat and with the club in great danger of bankruptcy, PSG supporters demanded the resignation of Francis Borelli. In May 1991, following the end of the season, Borelli sold the club to French television giants Canal+. On a bright note, the under-19 side of the PSG Academy won the club's first Coupe Gambardella against Auxerre (1–1; 3–1 on penalties) with future first-team players Pascal Nouma, Bernard Allou and Richard Dutruel leading the squad.

Players 
As of the 1990–91 season.

Squad

Out on loan

Transfers 

As of the 1990–91 season.

Arrivals

Departures

Kits 

French radio RTL and French eyewear brand Alain Afflelou were the shirt sponsors. American sportswear brand Nike was the kit manufacturer.

Friendly tournaments

Nike Cup

Tournoi Indoor de Paris-Bercy

First group stage (Group B)

Second group stage (Ranking Group)

Competitions

Overview

Division 1

League table

Results by round

Matches

Coupe de France

Statistics 

As of the 1990–91 season.

Appearances and goals 

|-
!colspan="16" style="background:#dcdcdc; text-align:center"|Goalkeepers

|-
!colspan="16" style="background:#dcdcdc; text-align:center"|Defenders

|-
!colspan="16" style="background:#dcdcdc; text-align:center"|Midfielders

|-
!colspan="16" style="background:#dcdcdc; text-align:center"|Forwards

|-
!colspan="16" style="background:#dcdcdc; text-align:center"|Players transferred / loaned out during the season

|-

References

External links 

Official websites
 PSG.FR - Site officiel du Paris Saint-Germain
 Paris Saint-Germain - Ligue 1 
 Paris Saint-Germain - UEFA.com

Paris Saint-Germain F.C. seasons
French football clubs 1990–91 season